Sybil Temchen (born June 7, 1979) is an American actress who has appeared in over 15 TV shows and pilots including, Revenge, Without a Trace, Close to Home, and Steven Bochco's Marriage.

Career
Born in New York City, Temchen is best known for her roles in The Passion of Ayn Rand, USA's remake of Kojak, Ten Benny, and others. She also starred in the movie Footprints (2011), which was written and directed by Steven Peros.

Filmography

Film

Television

References 

Living people
21st-century American actresses
American film actresses
American television actresses
1979 births